Shane Lacy Hensley is an author, game designer, and CEO of Pinnacle Entertainment Group and is a resident of Gilbert, Arizona.

Career
Shane Lacy Hensley was from Clintwood, Virginia, and began playing Dungeons & Dragons after he discovered the game through a series of comic-strip ads that were running in comic books in the 1980s. Hensley later sent West End Games an unsolicited Torg adventure he had written, which was soon published as The Temple of Rec Stalek (1992). Hensley did more work for FASA, TSR, and West End over the next few years.

Hensley created the game company Pinnacle Entertainment Group in 1994. Hensley wanted to create a 19th-century miniatures game and contacted local company Chameleon Eclectic about publishing it, which resulted in Fields of Honor: The American War for Independence (1994); ownership of the game remained with Pinnacle, but it was published in conjunction with Chameleon Eclectic. Hensley had the idea for a new game centering on cowboys and zombies as he was setting Pinnacle up, when he saw the Brom painting of a Confederate vampire on the cover of White Wolf's then-unreleased Necropolis: Atlanta; he thus began writing what would eventually become Deadlands. After completing a first draft, Henlsey flew in two friends and game designers, Greg Gorden and Matt Forbeck; both liked what they saw and asked to buy into Pinnacle, although Gorden soon left for personal reasons. Hensley did some computer game design work for SSI. Forbeck left Pinnacle a few years later, leaving Hensley as the sole owner.

On September 13, 2000, it was announced that Pinnacle had been sold to a company called Cybergames.com. Cybergames used acquisitions' income to buy other companies – harming the individual companies' cashflow and ruining production schedules – and Hensley announced on January 12, 2001 that the acquisition had been "undone", but not before considerable damage had been done to Pinnacle, leaving it with just a few employees. Hensley became part of the new d20 boom, kicking off a new d20-based Weird Wars campaign with Blood on the Rhine (2001). In 2003, Hensley formed a new company, Great White Games and transferred all of Pinnacle's IP to it, as well as publishing the new game Savage Worlds (2003). Hensley joined Cryptic Studios in 2004. With senior developer David "Zeb" Cook, Hensley was the senior writer on City of Villains (2005). Hensley designed the role-playing game Army of Darkness (2005) for Eden Studios.

Hensley also worked with Superstition Studios, which was working on a Deadlands MMORPG that never appeared. Hensley headed Dust Devil Studios where he brought Zombie Pirates (2010) to market. He later returned to Cryptic Studios and became  Executive Producer.

Hensley has written several novels and designed a variety of games including miniatures wargames, tabletop wargames, and role-playing games, as well as substantial freelance work writing modules for game systems. He has also scripted at least one computer game. Hensley has been a Guest of Honor at a number of major conventions and has garnered several game industry honors and awards.

He left Cryptic to make a Deadlands MMO in 2007, but the parent company went bankrupt. Hensley briefly returned to Cryptic in 2010 as Executive Producer on Neverwinter, then on to Petroglyph Games to work on the End of Nations MMORTS (published by Trion Worlds).

References

External links
Profile on Pinnacle Entertainment homepage
 
Publications at Amazon.com

20th-century American male writers
20th-century American novelists
American fantasy writers
American game designers
American male novelists
American video game designers
Board game designers
City of Heroes
Dungeons & Dragons game designers
Living people
Place of birth missing (living people)
People from Clintwood, Virginia
Role-playing game designers
Year of birth missing (living people)